Khalid El-Aabidi (born 14 September 1995) is a Moroccan Olympic weightlifter. He represented his country at the 2016 Summer Olympics.

References

External links 

 
 
 
 

1995 births
Living people
Moroccan male weightlifters
Weightlifters at the 2016 Summer Olympics
Olympic weightlifters of Morocco
21st-century Moroccan people